Brendan Philip Reidy (born 13 September 1968 in Wellington) is a New Zealand-born Samoan rugby union player. He plays as a prop.

Career
He spent his club career first with the Saracens between 1997 and 1999, then with Rugby Rovigo for two years, and later, with AS Montferrand from 2000 to 2002, when he retired from the playing career. He was part of the 1995 and 1999 Rugby World Cup rosters, where he played for Samoa. He also played the National Provincial Championship in New Zealand for Wellington.

References

External links

Brendan P. Reidy international statistics

1968 births
Living people
Samoan rugby union coaches
Samoan rugby union players
Rugby union players from Wellington City
Samoa international rugby union players
ASM Clermont Auvergne players
Rugby union props
Samoan people of New Zealand descent
New Zealand sportspeople of Samoan descent